Martha Berry is a Cherokee beadwork artist, who has been highly influential in reviving traditional Cherokee and Southeastern beadwork, particularly techniques from the pre-Removal period. She has been recognized as a Cherokee National Treasure and is the recipient of the Seven Star Award and the Tradition Keeper Award. Her work is shown in museums around the United States.

Background 
Martha Berry was born and raised in Tulsa, Oklahoma. She is a registered tribal citizen of the Cherokee Nation. Berry's grandmother and mother taught her how to sew and embroider at age five. She made her own clothes by age nine. When she was 20, she became a professional seamstress. She has expanded her skills by developing elaborate beadwork art. She taught herself the lost art of Cherokee beadwork by studying photographs of artifacts and examining Cherokee beaded artifacts at the Smithsonian Institution.

Artwork
Berry creates beaded bandolier bags, moccasins, belts, knee bands, purses and sashes. She often uses beadwork designs that evolved from pre-Contact Mississippian pottery into traditional 18th and 19th century Southeastern beadwork. Berry discovered a unique stitch only used on Southeastern sashes. She is credited with reviving the art of Cherokee beadwork, which had been in serious decline for many years. Her art, expressed through utilitarian items, demonstrates themes such as duality and change throughout life. Berry's beadwork also expresses "current day feelings of conflict, loss, distortion and confusion."  After she was recognized as a Cherokee National Treasure, she discussed her work: "I want to make beautiful things. I want to teach more and more people to do the same, and I want to grow more and more teachers of traditional Cherokee beadwork."

She has won prizes for her beadwork at the Cherokee Art Market, the Five Civilized Tribes Museum, the Heard Museum, and the Cherokee Heritage Center.  Berry has delivered lectures on the revival of pre-Contact Cherokee beadwork at the National Liberty Museum in Philadelphia; the Gilcrease Museum, Tulsa, Okla.; the Ah-Tah-Thi-Ki (Seminole) Museum in Clewiston, FL; the Bead Museum in Glendale, Arizona; Tyler Museum of Art in Tyler, Texas; Philbrook Museum of Art in Tulsa, OK; Oklahoma History Center in Oklahoma City, OK; National Cowboy and Western Heritage Museum in Oklahoma City, OK; Creek Council House Museum in Okmulgee, OK; and the Cherokee Heritage Center in Parkhill, OK.

Projects
Berry participated in the Native American Community Scholars Grant Program of the Smithsonian Institution. She has visited their collections to do further research into pre-Removal Southeastern beadwork, which has informed her own work.

Berry in 2008 curated Beadwork Storytellers: A Visual Language, a Cherokee beadwork exhibition at the Cherokee Heritage Center in Park Hill, Oklahoma.  The exhibition included beadwork from the collection of the University of Aberdeen  Museums, Scotland which had not been seen in the United States in almost two centuries.  Berry also wrote the text for the show catalog.

Personal
Berry lives in Rowlett, Texas with her husband, David. Her daughter, Christina Berry, is also a beader, photographer and publisher of the "All Things Cherokee website." Her daughter, Karen Berry, is a Cherokee finger-weaving and gourd artist.

She served as a delegate to the 1999 Cherokee Nation Constitution Convention in Tahlequah, Oklahoma. Her role in the convention helped the Cherokee nation in Oklahoma heal itself and "reassert itself as a capable sovereign in Oklahoma." She is currently an active member of several Cherokee organizations.

References

External links
 Martha Berry: Cherokee Beadwork Artist.
 All Things Cherokee Art Gallery: Martha Berry.
 Cherokee Artist's Association: Martha Berry.
Oral History with Martha Berry

American textile artists
Cherokee Nation artists
Native American bead artists
Year of birth missing (living people)
Living people
American women artists
Artists from Texas
Artists from Tulsa, Oklahoma
People from Tyler, Texas
Native American women artists
Women beadworkers
Women textile artists
21st-century Native Americans
21st-century Native American women
21st-century textile artists